This is a list of all The Professionals episodes, which comprises the following cast members: Gordon Jackson (George Cowley), Martin Shaw (Ray Doyle) and Lewis Collins (William Bodie).

Since the deaths of Gordon Jackson and Lewis Collins in 1990 and 2013 respectively, Martin Shaw is the only surviving cast member of the show.

Series overview 
The Professionals was produced by Brian Clemens's Avengers Mark 1 Productions for London Weekend Television (LWT) in five production blocks. These episodes were originally broadcast on the ITV network in a series of five scheduling runs. The transmission order of the episodes in these series was often different from the production order, but given that each episode was typically a self-contained story with no references to other episodes, this had little significance for viewers. Whilst earlier DVD releases tended to group the episodes in original ITV transmission order, Network's DVD & Blu-ray editions used production order.

 Production block 1 began in June 1977 with "Old Dog With New Tricks" and consisted of 13 episodes, completing in January 1978. These were originally screened in a single run by LWT, apart from "Klansmen" which was not broadcast due to concerns about the episode's racial content. As of 2016, this episode had still never been transmitted on UK terrestrial television. However, it is available to stream on BritBox UK. 
 Production block 2 began in June 1978 with "Rogue" and again consisted of 13 episodes. It was originally intended to complete during November 1978; however, actor Lewis Collins suffered a broken leg, meaning that filming of the last two episodes in the block ("The Madness of Mickey Hamilton" and "Servant of Two Masters") had to be postponed. These were not mounted until March 1979, immediately prior to the making of Block 3. LWT broadcast 10 of the episodes as Series 2 of the show, holding back three for the third series.
Production block 3 began in April 1979 (continuing immediately from the completion of the last two postponed episodes of block 2), and also consisted of 13 episodes, completing in November 1979. LWT broadcast half of these episodes as part of the show's third series, using the rest in series 4.
Production block 4 began in June 1980 with "The Gun" and again consisted of 13 episodes, completing in December 1980. LWT used half these episodes to make up the remainder of the show's fourth series, keeping the rest for transmission in series 5.
Production block 5 began in March 1981 with "Cry Wolf" and consisted of only 5 episodes, completing in May 1981. At this point the three main actors' contracts had expired, and neither Martin Shaw or Lewis Collins chose to renew them. LWT used these episodes to make up the remainder of the show's fifth series.

Episode list

Series 1 (1977–1978)

*Transmitted on former UK satellite channel Super in 1987, and currently on Amazon Prime UK and BritBox UK

Series 2 (1978)

Series 3 (1979)

Series 4 (1980)

Series 5 (1982–1983)

References

Professionals, The
Professionals episodes